The Democratic Party leadership election was held on 16 December 2012 for the 30-member 10th Central Committee of the Democratic Party in Hong Kong, including chairman and two vice-chairman posts. The incumbent acting Chairwomen Emily Lau defeated Vice-Chairman Sin Chung-kai by a narrow margin, becoming the first Chairwoman of the party. 300 party members voted in the election.

Eligibility
The Central Committee was elected by the party congress. All public office holders, including the members of the Legislative Council and District Councils, are eligible to vote in the party congress. Every 30 members can also elect a delegate who holds one vote in the congress.

Overview

After the devastating defeat in the 2012 Legislative Council election, Chairman Albert Ho resigned as leader, citing failure to present a united front for the pan-democratic camp, failure to retain seats from the previous elections, and infighting between pro-democracy parties. The chairmanship was temporarily taken over by vice-chairwoman Emily Lau until the leadership election in the end of the year.

Emily Lau, prominent figure in the pro-democracy camp who had been legislator for New Territories East since 1991 only joined and became one of the two Vice-Chairmen of the Democratic Party in 2008 after she quit her group the Frontier as founding convenor. Emily Lau decided to run in last-minute candidate after repeatedly saying she would not run.

Tho other vice-chairman Sin Chung-kai was the founding member of the party had returned into the LegCo in 2012 for Hong Kong Island after serving as the representative of the Information Technology functional constituency for ten years. Sin headed a 12-member team with the slogan "breakthrough, reform, democracy". The Team included Richard Tsoi Yiu-cheong and Lo Kin-hei who were contested for the two Vice-Chairman posts.

Southern District Councillor Au Nok-hin who was 25 years old, joined the party in 2009 and was elected a district councillor in 2011. Au ran for the Chairman post but he said he knew he had little chance of winning but wanted to demonstrate the party did not have a "big brother culture".

Candidates

Chairman
 Emily Lau, Legislative Council member for New Territories East and acting Chairwoman of the Democratic Party
 Sin Chung-kai, Legislative Council member for Hong Kong Island and Vice-Chairman of the Democratic Party
 Au Nok-hin, Southern District Councillor

Vice-Chairmen
 Richard Tsoi, Democratic Party's Community Officer of the New Territories East Branch
 Lo Kin-hei, Southern District Councillor
 Wu Chi-wai, Legislative Council member for Kowloon East and member of the Central Committee

Elections

Results
The incumbent acting Chairwomen Emily Lau defeated Vice-Chairman Sin Chung-kai by a narrow margin, becoming the first Chairwoman of the party. Nevertheless, Richard Tsoi Yiu-cheong and Lo Kin-hei were both elected as Vice-Chairmen, by defeating legislator Wu Chi-wai for Kowloon East. Wu still won the most votes for a seat on the Central Committee. Lo, 28 years old, became the youngest Vice-Chairman of the party's history. 11 of the 30 new central committee members were under 40 years old with the average age of 44, 4 years younger than the last committee.

The elected members of the 10th Central Committee are listed as following:
Chairlady: Emily Lau
Vice-Chairmen: Richard Tsoi, Lo Kin-hei
Secretary: Cheung Yin-tung
Treasurer: Ng Wing-fai
Executive Committee Members:

 Au Nok-hin
 Cheung Man-kwong
 Josephine Chan Shu-ying
 Joseph Chow Kam-siu
 Lee Wing-tat
 Ricky Or Yiu-lam
 Andrew Wan Siu-kin
 Helena Wong Pik-wan
 Wu Chi-wai

Central Committee Members:

 Chai Man-hon
 Andrew Chiu Ka-yin
 Albert Ho Chun-yan
 Kwong Chun-yu
 Lai King-wai
 Lam Chung-hoi
 Eric Lam Lap-chi
 Mark Li Kin-yin
 Li Wing-shing
 Christopher Tsoi Yu-lung
 Sin Chung-kai
 Tsui Hon-kwong
 Wong King-fong
 Wong Sing-chi
 Yeung Sum
 Yuen Hoi-man

Aftermath
Political analyst Ma Ngok expressed disappointment at the result and doubted the new leader could rejuvenate the party. "Lau is a veteran politician who first ran in a direct election for the Legislative Council 20 years ago. She belongs to the first generation, like Sin. She has appeared to be quite distant from civil society in recent years. How can she rejuvenate the party? She won by a narrow margin. Neither she nor Sin is a popular leader," Ma said.

References

Political party leadership elections in Hong Kong
Democratic Party (Hong Kong)
2012 in Hong Kong
Elections in Hong Kong
Democratic Party (HK) leadership election